Adibi is a surname. People with this surname include:

 Akbar Adibi (1939–2000), Iranian electronic engineer, VLSI researcher, and university professor
 Nathaniel Adibi (born 1981), American footballer (defensive end)
 Saleh Adibi, Iranian academic and diplomat
 Xavier Adibi (born 1984), American footballer (linebacker)